Lishan is a town under the administration of Fuyang City, Zhejiang, People's Republic of China, located on the southern (right) bank of the Fuchun River  east of downtown Fuyang and  south-southwest of Hangzhou's West Lake. , it has five villages under its administration.

See also
List of township-level divisions of Zhejiang

References

Towns of Zhejiang
Geography of Hangzhou